Labhuani is a village in Garhani block of Bhojpur district, Bihar, India. In 2011, its population was 1,246, in 258 households.

References 

Villages in Bhojpur district, India